Rolia رولیا is a village in Sabour Union Council of Gujrat District and tehsil kharian in the Punjab province of Pakistan. Sabour and Banian are neighbouring villages.

Geography 
Geographically, Roulia is situated on a plain. It is situated between Sabour and Banian Villages alongside Bhimber Road. The Nala Bhandar river flows on the eastern side of the village. Alongside "Nala Bhandar" there is a small dense forest called Balee. Bhimber Road bisects the village into two halves; on the western side Ladiyan village is situated, in North Sabour Village is located and in South Banian Village is located.

References

Villages in Kharian Tehsil